Mount Hayden is an -elevation summit located in the Grand Canyon, in Coconino County of Arizona, United States. Mount Hayden, also known as Hayden Peak, is named for Charles T. Hayden (1825–1900), an Arizona pioneer influential in the development of the Arizona Territory where he was known as the "Father of Tempe", and he established Arizona State University. He was also the father of US Senator Carl Hayden, as well as a probate judge. This geographical feature's name was officially adopted in 1932 by the U.S. Board on Geographic Names. The first ascent of the summit was made May 1978 by Joe Sharber, George Bain, and Abra Watkins via the north side ( A2). Pegasus, a challenging class 5.10+ route on the East Face, was first climbed by Paul Davidson and Jim Haisley in 1982. The most popular climbing route is the class 5.8 South Face. According to the Köppen climate classification system, Mount Hayden is located in a Cold semi-arid climate zone.

Geology

The summit spire of Mount Hayden is composed of cream-colored, cliff-forming, Permian Coconino Sandstone caprock. This sandstone, which is the third-youngest of the strata in the Grand Canyon, was deposited 265 million years ago as sand dunes. Below this Coconino Sandstone is reddish, slope-forming, Permian Hermit Formation, which in turn overlays the Pennsylvanian-Permian Supai Group. Precipitation runoff from this feature drains east into the Colorado River via Nankoweap Creek.

Gallery

See also
 Geology of the Grand Canyon area
 Brady Peak

References

External links 

 Weather forecast: National Weather Service
 Mount Hayden rock climbing: Mountainproject.com

Grand Canyon, North Rim
Grand Canyon
Landforms of Coconino County, Arizona
Mountains of Arizona
Mountains of Coconino County, Arizona
North American 2000 m summits
Colorado Plateau
Grand Canyon National Park
Sandstone formations of the United States